Agdistis gittia is a moth in the family Pterophoridae. It is known from Spain.

The wingspan is 22–23 mm. The forewings and hindwings are greyish brown.

References

Agdistinae
Moths described in 1988